Tomasz Bednarek and Igor Zelenay were the defending champions. They didn't participate that year.
Rubén Ramírez Hidalgo and Santiago Ventura defeated Dominik Hrbatý and Martin Kližan 6–2, 7–6(5) in the final.

Seeds

Draw

Draw

References
 Doubles Draw

Kosice Open - Doubles
2009 Doubles